The  1974-75 French Rugby Union Championship was won by  Béziers beating Brive in the final.

Formula 
For the last time the "elite" were formed of 64 clubs (in later years reduced to 40). The clubs were divided in 8 pools and the first four of each pool were qualified for knockout stages.

The last three of each pool (24 clubs) will be relegated in the future "Group B"

The knockout stages, will be played with single match rounds.

Qualification round 

The clubs classified in the four first places of each pool (24 clubs on 32) were qualified for the knockout stages.

The team are here listed in ranking order, in bold, the team qualified.

Knockout stages

"Last 32" 
In bold the clubs qualified for the next round

"Last 16" 
In bold the clubs qualified for the next round

Quarter of finals 
In bold the clubs qualified for the next round

Semifinals

Final

External links
 Compte rendu finale de 1975 lnr.fr

1975
France 1975
Championship